Carmen Salinas de la Vega (María del Carmen Celestina Ascencia Salinas y de la Vega (June 1807 – ?) was an Ecuadorian aristocrat, and the First Lady of Ecuador to Manuel de Ascásubi from 1849 to 1850 and once again in 1869.

Biography
Carmen Salinas de la Vega was born María del Carmen Celestina Ascencia Salinas y de la Vega to Juan de Salinas y Zenitagoya, a hero of the Ecuadorian War of Independence, and his wife María de la Vega y Nates, a Creole. María de la Vega died on 1 December 1820 and was buried at the Basílica de Nuestra Señora de la Merced, leaving Maria Dolores to look after Carmen. After the War of Ecuadorian Independence recovered their properties when it was restored to them by Colonel Antonio José de Sucre in 1822.

Marriage and descendants
They had four daughters:

 Avelina Ascázubi y Salinas de la Vega, married to the widower of María Dolores, her cousin José María Lasso de la Vega, with whom she had two children:
José Manuel Lasso de la Vega and Ascázubi, born in Paris and married María Esther Paulina Carrión
, married Leónidas Plaza. Her son, Galo Plaza, would also be President of Ecuador
 María Ascázubi y Salinas de la Vega, married to her distant cousin Cristóbal Jijón, with whom she had two children:
Antonia Jijón y Ascázubi, married her cousin Neptalí Bonifaz and Ascázubi
Dolores Jijón and Ascázubi, married Enrique Gangotena
 Dolores Ascázubi y Salinas de la Vega, married her cousin José María Lasso de la Vega, with whom she became a widower and have no children.
 Josefina Ascázubi y Salinas de la Vega,  married to José Mateo Neptalí Bonifaz, with whom she had two children:
Neptalí Bonifaz y Ascázubi, married his cousin Antonia Jijón y Ascázubi
Manuel, married María del Tránsito Filomena Francisca Rosa Hipólita Panizo

See also
 Manuel de Ascásubi
 Juan de Salinas y Zenitagoya

Citations

1807 births
Year of death unknown
People from Quito
First ladies of Ecuador